Agriphila trabeatellus is a species of moth in the family Crambidae. The species was described by Gottlieb August Wilhelm Herrich-Schäffer in 1848. It is found in France, Spain, Portugal, Italy, Greece and on Corsica, Sardinia, Sicily, Malta and Crete, as well as in Asia Minor, Lebanon, Algeria, Libya and the Canary Islands.

Subspecies
Agriphila trabeatellus trabeatellus (Europe, Algeria, Libya, Asia Minor, Lebanon)
Agriphila trabeatellus canariensis (Rebel, 1892) (Canary Islands)

References

Moths described in 1848
Crambini
Moths of Europe
Moths of Africa
Moths of Asia